Alfred Morgan may refer to:

 Alfred Powell Morgan (1889–1972), electrical engineer, inventor, and author
 Stan Morgan (Alfred Stanley Morgan, 1920–1971), Welsh footballer
 Alfred Morgan (footballer) (1879–?), English footballer

See also
Alf Morgans, fourth Premier of Western Australia
Al Morgan (disambiguation)